The Speedway World Team Cup was an annual speedway event held each year in different countries. The competition started in 1960 and was replaced with the Speedway World Cup in 2001.

Format
From 1960 until 1985 each team consisted of four riders and a reserve. A final meeting was held after qualifying rounds, the winner being decided on total points scored in that final meeting. In 1986, the teams that qualified for the 'final' raced three meetings, the winner of each meeting being awarded three points, second place awarded two points, and third  place awarded a point. The total points gained over the three meetings determined the champion. In 1987, the three meeting system was used again, but this time the aggregate points scored by the individual riders were added together to determine the champion. 1988 saw the championship revert to the original format. In 1994 the World Pairs Championship was merged with the World Team Cup and this system was used until 1999 when it once gain reverted to the original format. In 2001 the competition was relaunched as the Speedway World Cup.

Winners

Medal classification

See also
Speedway World Pairs Championship
Speedway World Cup
Team Speedway Junior World Championship (U-21)
List of world cups and world championships

References

 
Team
Recurring sporting events established in 1960
Recurring sporting events disestablished in 2000